The Melbourne Rugby Union Football Club, is a rugby union football club based in Melbourne, Australia. Nicknamed the Unicorns, the club plays at Romanis Reserve in Prahran and was founded in 1926. The club's colours are green, blue and gold.

History
Melbourne rugby union football club is one of the two oldest clubs in Victoria (the oldest being Melbourne University Rugby Football Club). Officially established in 1926, some 38 years after the first game of rugby was played in Victoria, under the 'Melbourne Rugby Union' banner. The first rugby union games were played in Victoria were in 1888. Three games are recorded as being played that year:- one against a British touring team and two against a New Zealand Natives side. The match against the British was lost, but the second Natives' games was a draw; the game they play in heaven had arrived in Victoria.

Until the establishment of Melbourne Rugby club, Victorian rugby was a somewhat stop start affair, due in no small part to World War I. The Victorian Rugby Union (VRU) was established in early 1926 when Melbourne and the five other clubs then playing Rugby League, St Kilda, Melbourne University, Kiwis, RAAF and Navy  agreed to wind up the Victorian Rugby League.

During the period 1930-35, Dave Cowper became the club's and Victoria's first Australian international representative and, in 1933, captained Australia against the Springboks in South Africa.

In the early days of the late 1920s and 1930s, Melbourne Rugby Club's motto of that era was "Praemia Post Habeas Ludo" (loosely translated as "After the Battle, Enjoy the Prize"). Following the club's amalgamation in 1939 with Old Boys Rugby Club and prior to his departure, that year, to military duties in World War II, the club accepted the recommendation of club member Weary Dunlop, that the rampant unicorn become the club emblem along with his suggested new club motto "Never a step backward"

Both the emblem and the motto along with the club's victory song "We're on the march with Melbourne's Army" are still deeply embedded in the Melbourne Rugby Club 'psyche.' Another mark of recognition of Melbourne RUFC was introduced by R.I. Kingman in the early Sixties. The sound of 'Who's that man with the big red nose' has become synonymous with MRUFC throughout Victorian rugby circles.

In 1959 MRUFC gained the rights to play on Romanis Reserve. Commonly known as Orrong Park, it is situated on Orrong Road, between High Street and Malvern Roads, Prahran, and is regarded as one of the best playing surfaces in the Victorian union.

In recent years the Melbourne Rugby club has enjoyed some extraordinary success. In 2009, the club's centenary year the first grade side came from last to first, to win the Dewar Shield for the club's 15th time (the most of any club in Victoria). On 11 September 2010, the club went one step further with all 4 senior sides winning their respective competitions. The first club to ever do this in Victoria and second in Australia.

See also

References

External links
 Melbourne Rugby website

Rugby union teams in Victoria (Australia)
Rugby clubs established in 1909
Sporting clubs in Melbourne
1909 establishments in Australia
Sport in the City of Stonnington